The Higher School Certificate (HSC) is the credential awarded to secondary school students who successfully complete senior high school level studies (Years 11 and 12 or equivalent) in New South Wales and some ACT schools in Australia, as well as some international schools in Singapore, Malaysia, Indonesia, China, Papua New Guinea and Tonga. It was first introduced in 1967, with the last major revision coming into effect in 2019. It is currently developed and managed by the NSW Education Standards Authority (NESA).

Patterns of study

The majority of students undertake HSC-related courses over the final two years of high school, though it is possible to undertake different study patterns over different time periods or through different teaching organisations.

There are a great number of possible courses students can study, totalling over 100 (including languages), in a wide range of subject areas. However, most schools offer students a smaller selection from which they must choose. The only compulsory subject area is English, with one of English Advanced, English Standard, English as an Additional Language or Dialect (EAL/D), or English Studies required for the award of the HSC. (English Extension 1 is also available for English Advanced students, with Extension 2 being offered in Year 12). Individual schools may require their students to undertake certain courses, as is the case with Studies of Religion in many religious schools or Agriculture in agricultural schools. However, these are internal school requirements separate from HSC requirements.

Most courses offered comprise a preliminary (Year 11) component and an HSC (Year 12) component. As a general rule the preliminary component must be completed prior to the HSC component. Furthermore, each subject is designated as either one or two "units". Each unit involves approximately two hours of formal tuition per week, and contributes a maximum mark of 50. The majority of courses are two unit courses, and thus students receive marks out of 100 in these courses. 10 units is the minimum number of units required, however students can attempt more should they choose. If they do, their final ATAR mark is calculated using their best 2 units of English and 8 best other units. Extension courses, each with a value of one unit, may be included in the study program, meaning that a certain subject area may have up to four units, e.g. English (Advanced) (two units) plus English Extension 1 and English Extension 2 (each worth one unit).

To be eligible for the award of the HSC a student must have satisfied the requirements in at least twelve preliminary level units, and at least ten HSC level units, with the additional requirements that:
 at least two must be English units;
 at least six units must be Board-developed courses;
 at least three courses are of two unit or greater value.
 at least four subjects have been completed.
 no more than seven units of science are studied. This was changed from six units in 2019 with the addition of the Science Extension subject.

Further restrictions may apply in certain subject areas.

Note that these requirements are for the award of the HSC. Further requirements regarding study patterns apply if the student wishes to apply for a separate Australian Tertiary Admission Rank (ATAR) based on their HSC performance.

Available courses

There are two main types of courses available in the HSC: Board Developed Courses and Board Endorsed Courses. Board Developed Courses have a syllabus and final exam set by NESA, and generally may be included in the calculation of the ATAR. Board Endorsed Courses are developed by the school, and may vary from school to school in regards to content and assessment.

English
Being the only mandatory course for HSC, for English, students must choose between one of the English courses available to study.
English (Standard)
English (Advanced)
English Extension 1 (only available to students studying English (Advanced))
English Extension 2 (only available to students studying English (Advanced) and English (Extension 1))
English as an Additional Language or Dialect (EAL/D) (only available to eligible students)
English Studies

Elective Courses
The following is a list of elective Board Developed Courses currently available to students.

HSIE (Human Society and Its Environment):
Aboriginal Studies
Ancient History
Business Studies
Economics
Geography
History Extension (only available to students studying Ancient History and/or Modern History during Year 12)
Legal Studies
Modern History
Society and Culture
Studies of Religion I
Studies of Religion II

Mathematics:
Mathematics Standard 1
Mathematics Standard 2 
Mathematics Advanced
Mathematics Extension 1 (only available to students studying Mathematics Advanced)
Mathematics Extension 2 (only available to students studying Mathematics Advanced and Mathematics (Extension 1); only available in Year 12)

Science:
Biology
Chemistry
Earth and Environmental Science
Physics
Investigating Science
Science Extension (only available to students studying 1 Unit of any Science in Year 12)

Technology:
Agriculture
Design and Technology
Engineering Studies
Food Technology
Industrial Technology
Information Processes and Technology
Software Design and Development
Textiles and Design

Creative Arts:
Dance
Drama
Music 1
Music 2
Music Extension (only available to students studying Music 2)
Visual Arts

PDHPE (Personal Development, Health and Physical Education):
PDHPE (Health and Movement Science [HAMS] from 2020)
Community and Family Studies

Board Endorsed Courses:
Ceramics
Computing Applications
Exploring Early Childhood
Marine Studies
Photography, Video and Digital Imaging
Sport, Lifestyle and Recreation Activities
Visual Design
Work Studies

Language Courses
Languages are also offered as Beginners, Continuers, Extension, Background Speakers and recently, Heritage courses. Only one course of any one language may be taken, with the exception of Extension, available only to students taking the Continuers course. Due to the large number of language courses, they have been listed separately. The letters B (beginners), C (continuers), E (extension), BS (background speakers), H (heritage) indicate which courses are available for study.

Years 11 and 12.

Arabic B, C, E
Armenian C
Chinese B, C, E, BS, H
Classical Greek C, E
Classical Hebrew C, E
Croatian C
Dutch C
Filipino C
French B, C, E
German B, C, E
Hindi C
Hungarian C
Indonesian B, C, E, BS, H
Italian B, C, E
Japanese B, C, E, BS, H
Khmer C
Korean C, BS, H
Latin C, E
Macedonian C
Malay BS
Maltese C
Modern Greek B, C, E
Modern Hebrew C
Persian BS
Polish C
Portuguese C
Russian BS
Serbian C
Spanish B, C, E
Swedish C
Tamil C
Turkish C
Ukrainian C
Vietnamese C

VET Courses
In addition, some VET (Vocational Education and Training) courses are offered. In addition to HSC credit, completion of these courses may earn an industry Certificate II. Ten of these are Board Developed Courses (BDC)

Accounting (BDC)
Animal Studies
Aviation
Business Services (BDC)
Child Care
Construction (BDC)
Entertainment Industry (BDC)
Financial Services
Hairdressing
Horticulture
Hospitality (BDC)
Information and Digital Technology (BDC)
Marketing
Metal and Engineering (BDC)
Primary Industries (BDC)
Sport, Fitness and Recreation 
Retail Services (BDC)
Tourism (BDC)

HSC Syllabus Reform (2019) 
A major HSC Syllabus reform was executed in 2019. The "new" syllabus involved the addition of "Science Extension" and "Investigating Science" as new courses. These courses were made available to students that commenced teaching in October 2018 for the cohort of 2019. The course "Senior Science" was discontinued as of October 2018. The reformed syllabus involved changes that are a move towards compulsory English, Physics, Chemistry, Biology, Investigating Science and Extension Science in the future.

English 
Changes introduced to compulsory English discontinued the field of study "Discovery" as NESA discovered students would simply hire and pay off third party tutoring companies and/or private tutors in order to completely memorise and regurgitate essay information, in turn causing an imbalance in advantage towards the state of NSW. For the new syllabus, English questions have now become more specific, prompting on-the-spot answers in turn rigorously testing students natural English writing ability and ability to analyse and interpret unseen questions, texts and information.

Assessment
A student's final mark in each subject is determined by a combination of in-school assessments conducted throughout the HSC component of a course, and externally administered final exam(s) typically held in October or November of that year. In addition to comprising half of a student's final assessment result in a subject, external exam results are also used to statistically moderate in-school assessment results between different schools.

These exams are administered by NESA, which is responsible for the overall oversight of the HSC.

Award

Upon successful completion of a satisfactory pattern of study students are awarded the Higher School Certificate by way of a testamur.

Whenever a student has completed a course they also receive feedback regarding their results in that course, which typically includes exam results, school assessment results and the performance band in which their performance lies.

Students who achieve excellent results of over 90 in 10 units of study in the HSC are awarded the Premier's Award by the New South Wales government. The most outstanding of these students may also be awarded the Australian Student Prize by the Commonwealth government. The T G Room award of the Mathematical Association of New South Wales is given to the student with the best score in the highest-level HSC mathematics examination.

HSC results may also be used to calculate the Australian Tertiary Admission Rank (ATAR). Similar ranking processes used previously were called the UAI (Universities Admission Index) and the TER (Tertiary Entrance Rank). The ATAR is a separate ranking calculated by another body, the Universities Admissions Centre (UAC), and is used for determining university entrance. Since 1998 the university entrance rank has been issued separately from the HSC results in order to distinguish the two.

Vocational equivalent
The vocational equivalent to Year 12 will change from certificate II in 2015 to certificate III in 2020 by the Council of Australian Governments, mainly because Year 12 qualification has minimal hours greater than those of a level II qualification, where they correspond more closely to the hours of level III qualification. Although the completion of high school would lead to better labour market results, it is also
established that a scholarly pathway is not always suited for all and that some are unaccustomed to the institutionalised nature of schools. This has led to an understanding that there should be alternatives to Year 12 completion. As such, the idea of a vocational equivalent to Year 12 is a response to this. The construct of a vocational equivalent to completing a senior school certificate (denoted by the completion of Year 12) has been an attribute of government policy since the late 1990s, with a declaration stating:

"All students have access to the high quality education necessary to enable the completion of school education to Year 12 or its vocational equivalent and that provides clear and recognised pathways to employment and further education and training."Ministerial Council on Employment, Education, Training and Youth Affairs 1999, Goal 3.6

Impact on Adolescents 
A NSW Health report found that 1 in 11 adolescents who committed suicide had experienced significant levels of HSC-related stress.

See also
 Education in Australia
 University admission
 Victorian Certificate of Education
 South Australian Certificate of Education
 Tasmanian Certificate of Education
 Western Australian Certificate of Education
 ACT Scaling Test
 Queensland Certificate of Education
 Overall Position (Queensland)
 Bored of Studies

References

External links
 NESA

Education in New South Wales
School qualifications
School examinations
Australian Certificate of Education
1967 establishments in Australia